Like A Waterfall is James Marsters' second solo album. In this album, Marsters moves away from his original rock sound, and he plays songs with a much more bluesy feel to them.

Track listing 
Not A Millionaire -3:42
Looking At You - 2:55
Don't Worry Son - 3:37
Birth of the Blues - 3:19
White Hot Girls - 2:48
London City - 3:18
Up On Me - 3:19
Like A Waterfall - 2:57
Louise - 2:43
When I Was A Baby - 2:51
Layabout - 2:54
Too Fast - 3:05

2007 albums